KEBR 88.1 FM is a non-commercial traditional Christian radio station in Sacramento, California, which runs programming from Family Radio. Its transmitter is located in Walnut Grove, California. The station first went on the air in 1996 as KEDR, until October 17, 2005, when KEAR San Francisco moved from FM to AM, and KEDR became KEAR-FM, becoming KEBR 10 years later. This allowed Family Radio to keep a network of FM translators for KEBR, as Federal Communications Commission (FCC) regulations did not allow FM translators for AM stations at the time.

Prior to May 2003, KEBR-FM 89.3 FM in North Highlands, California also aired Family Radio programming, but this station was sold to KQED-FM and became KQEI-FM.

The station changed its call sign to the current KEBR on September 18, 2015. KEBR airs several Christian ministry broadcasts from noted teachers such as RC Sproul, Alistair Begg, Ken Ham, John F. MacArthur, Adriel Sanchez, Dennis Rainey, John Piper, & others as well as traditional and modern hymns & songs by Keith & Kristyn Getty, The Master's Chorale, Fernando Ortega, Chris Rice, Shane & Shane, Sovereign Grace Music, Sara Groves, & multiple other Christian and Gospel music artists.

External links

EBR
Family Radio stations
EBR
Radio stations established in 1996